Playing For Change is a multimedia music project, featuring musicians and singers from across the globe, co-founded in 2002 by American Grammy award-winning music producer/engineer and award-winning film director Mark Johnson and film producer/philanthropist Whitney Kroenke. Playing For Change also created in 2007 a separate non-profit organization called the Playing For Change Foundation, which builds music and art schools for children around the world.

Origin
Playing For Change (PFC) was founded in 2002 by Mark Johnson and Whitney Kroenke. Mark Johnson was walking in Santa Monica, California, when he heard the voice of Roger Ridley (deceased in 2005) singing "Stand By Me"; it was this experience that sent Playing For Change on its mission to connect the world through music.

Travelling the world with a small film and recording team, producers Johnson and Enzo Buono developed a mobile recording studio (originally powered by golf cart batteries) for recording and filming musicians live outdoors,  and progressively editing all the separate artists, blending all into one performance as PFC travelled from artist to artist, country to country. Starting with a studio made demo in the right key and tempo, "we would deconstruct [the track]" as each recorded musician or singer could listen with headphones to what had been recorded before them, and playing the same song, adding into the mix their own style.  For the project Johnson has recorded and filmed music in more than 50 countries across the world.

More than 150 -- mostly street -- musicians from 25 countries have combined their talents to create a global phenomenon with millions of followers across the world. Artists participating or openly involved in the project are Mermans Mosengo, Marcus King, Lukas Nelson, Char, Orbe Ortiz, Paulo Heman, Peter Bunetta, Roberto Luti, Titi Tsira, Jason Tamba, Keiko Komaki, Vusi Mahlasela, Louis Mhlanga, Clarence Bekker, David Guido Pietroni, Tal Ben Ari (Tula), Bono, Keb' Mo', David Broza, Manu Chao, Grandpa Elliott, Keith Richards, The Pocket Queen, Toots Hibbert from Toots & the Maytals, Taj Mahal and Stephen Marley. This resulted in the documentary A Cinematic Discovery of Street Musicians that won the Audience Award at the Woodstock Film Festival in September 2008.

In April 2009, the first album was released with ”Songs around the world” a collection of the first years of the multimedia project, debuted at number 10 on Billboard's Pop Chart. The band's version of the Ben E. King classic -- which interwove the performances of 18 street musicians, including a South African choir -- in 2012 had more than 40 million views on YouTube alone. The Playing for Change Band  an international touring band that brings artists of all backgrounds together, raising money and awareness for the foundation, features individual musicians from across the globe that the multimedia project has met through the years of travelling, recording and filming, and is regularly touring the world to spread the word of the basis of the Playing For Change foundation.

During their travels the project met and recorded many musicians from across the globe, some of whom lived in underprivileged communities, Playing For Change project decided to give something back. After the making of two documentaries about the multimedia project, Playing for Change: A Cinematic Discovery of Street Musicians, and Playing For Change: Peace Through Music, the founders of Playing For Change project created the Playing For Change Foundation, a separate 501(c)3 nonprofit organization. PFC was approached by the United Nations Population Fund to celebrate via a virtual concert the United Nations' 75th anniversary in December 2020.

Musical collaborations
● PFC has recorded more than 1,000 musicians from 50+ countries

● PFC has worked with Bono (from the band U2), Keith Richards (from the band The Rolling Stones), Manu Chao, Toots Hibbert, Ziggy Marley, Keb' Mo', Baaba Maal, Char, Tinariwen, Los Lobos, Jackson Browne, Taj Mahal, Jimmy Buffett, Sara Bareilles, Maroon 5, Robert Plant, John Densmore, Stephen Marley, Bombino, Bill Kreutzmann (from the band Grateful Dead), David Crosby, Chad Smith (from the Red Hot Chili Peppers), Jason Mraz, Josh Groban, Jake Shimabukuro, Yo-Yo Ma, Citizen Cope, Bernie Williams, Trombone Shorty, Buddy Guy, The Doobie Brothers (Tom Johnston, John McFee and Pat Simmons), Jack Johnson, Ben Harper, Tom Morello, Nattali Rize Billy Branch James Gadson, Pancho Amat, Warren Haynes, Ivan and Cyril Neville, Rocky Dawuni, David Guido Pietroni, Jon Cleary, Donald Kinsey, Lee Oskar (from the band War), Robbie Robertson, Dr. John, Ringo Starr, Aloe Blacc, Angélique Kidjo, Annie Lennox, Becky G, Brandi Carlile with Mike McCready of Pearl Jam, Carlos Santana and Cindy Blackman Santana, Gabi Melim, Gary Clark Jr., Jim James, Keith Richards, Mavis Staples, Nathaniel Rateliff, Peter Gabriel, Rhiannon Giddens, Robert Randolph, Run The Jewels with Josh Homme, Sheila E., Skip Marley and Cedella Marley, and The War and Treaty.

Playing For Change Foundation
Since 2007 the Playing for Change Foundation, a 501(c)3 non-profit organization, has created and supported fifteen music school programs across eleven developing countries:
 Imvula Music Program, Gugulethu, South Africa
 Bizung School of Music & Dance, Tamale, Ghana
 Udayapur Nepal Music Program, Udayapur District, Nepal
 Ecole de Musique de Kirina, Kirina, Mali
 Tintale Village Mother's Society, Nepal
 Ubuntu Music Program, Kigali, Rwanda
 Mitrata Nepal Village Music Program, Kathmandu, Nepal
 Musica Music Institute, Kathmandu, Nepal
 Khlong Toey Music Program, Bangkok, Thailand
 Cajuru Music Program, Curitiba, Brazil
 Mirpur Music Program, Dhaka, Bangladesh
 Joudour Sahara Music Program, M'Hamid El Ghizlane, Morocco
 Playing For Change Patagonia, Patagonia, Argentina
 Baja Musical Arts Intensive, Tijuana, Mexico
 PFC Diamante, Argentina Diamante, Argentina

In 2011, the Playing For Change Foundation established an annual Playing For Change Day. The goal of Playing For Change Day is to "unite a global community through the power of music to affect positive social change". In 2012, the PFC Day consisted of over 330 events across 52 countries and helped raise over $150,000 for the Playing For Change Foundation, and in 2014, PFC Day saw over 400 events in 60 countries. It is held on the Saturday nearest the United Nations' International Day of Peace, which takes place each year on September 21. In 2015, Playing for Change Day was celebrated on September 19. The sixth-annual Playing for Change Day was on September 24, 2016.

In 2019, the Playing For Change Foundation was awarded the Polar Music Prize.

Discography

See also

 World music
 Street performance

References

External links
 
 Playing For Change Foundation
  4,036,204 views

American world music groups
Musical groups established in 2002
Arts foundations based in the United States
Educational foundations in the United States
Street performance
Performances
2008 in music
2009 albums
Asia Game Changer Award winners